Grzegorz Witold Kołodko (pronounced ; born 28 January 1949 in Tczew, Poland) is a distinguished professor of economics. A key architect of Polish economic reforms. He is the author of New Pragmatism original paradigmatic and heterodox theory of economics. University lecturer, researcher, the author of numerous academic books and research papers. As Deputy Premier and Minister of Finance of Poland in 2002–2003 he played a leading role in achieving the entry of Poland into the European Union. Holding the same position in 1994–1997, Kolodko led Poland into the OECD.

The founder and director of TIGER – Transformation, Integration and Globalization Economic Research at the Kozminski University in Warsaw. He is consultant to such international organizations as the IMF, World Bank, UN, and the OECD, a member of the European Academy of Arts, Sciences and Humanities, Academia Europaea and the Russian Academy of Sciences, a non-resident senior fellow, at Chongyang Institute for Financial Studies, Renmin University of China in Beijing, Professor HUST at Huangzhou University of Science and Technology, Wuhan, distinguished professor of Emerging Markets Institute, Beijing Normal University, Beijing.

Biography
After graduating from Main School of Planning and Statistics in 1972 and gaining his Ph.D. in 1976 he lectured at the same university and was appointed to a chair in economics in 1984. In 1985-86 he was Senior Fulbright Fellow at the University of Illinois in Urbana-Champaign. In 1982-88 advisor to the Governor of National Bank of Poland. Participant in the historic ‘Round Table’ negotiations in 1989, which led to the first post-communist government in Eastern Europe. He was a member of the Economic Council of the Polish Government in 1989-91.

Research fellow at the United Nations World Institute for Development Economics Research (WIDER) in Helsinki in 1988, 1989, and 2002. In 1989-1994 director of the Institute of Finance, Warsaw. He was consultant to the International Monetary Fund Research Department in 1991 and 2000, and to the Fiscal Policy Department in 1992 and 1999. In 1994 senior research fellow at the Institute of Finance and Monetary Policy in Tokyo. In 1997-1998 was appointed to the Sasakawa Chair and distinguished research professor in development policy at WIDER. In 1998 visiting fellow at the World Bank and senior research fellow at Yale University.

He is the author and editor of 58 books and over 400 articles and research papers, published in 26 languages, much in English (http://www.tiger.edu.pl/english/kolodko/publikacje.htm). The books in English include: “The Quest for Development Success: Bridging Theoretical Reasoning with Economic Practice”, Rowman & Littlefield - Lexington Books,  Lanhm-Boulder-New York-London 2021, “China and the Future of Globalization: The Political Economy of China's Rise”, Bloomsbury I.B. Tauris, London-New York 2020, “Emerging Market Economies. Globalization and Development” (co-author and editor), Routledge Revivals, Abingdon, Oxon, UK and New York 2018,  "Whither the World: The Political Economy of the Future", Palgrave Macmillan, Houndmills, Basingstoke, Hampshire 2014, „Truth, Errors and Lies. Politics and Economics in a Volatile World”, Columbia University Press 2011 (published also in 10 other languages), „20 years of transformation. Achievements – Problems – Perspectives” (co-author and editor), Nova Science 2011; “Transition and Beyond”, Palgrave Macmillan 2007 (co-author and editor); “The World Economy and Great Post-Communist Change”, Nova Science 2006; “The Polish Miracle. Lessons for the Emerging Markets”, Ashgate 2005 (co-author and editor); “Globalization and Social Stress”, Nova Science 2005 (co-author and editor); “Emerging Market Economies. Globalization and Development”, Ashgate 2003 (co-author and editor); “Globalization and Catching-up in Transition Economies”, University of Rochester Press 2002 (published also in 11 other languages); “From Shock to Therapy. The Political Economy of Postsocialist Transformation”, Oxford University Press 2000 (published also in Chinese, Russian, Ukrainian, Japanese, and Polish); “Post-Communist Transition: The Thorny Road”, University of Rochester Press 2000.

He has held courses and seminars at the Warsaw School of Economics (SGPiS/SGH) and at Kozminski University, as well as at several other universities, particularly in the United States of America – Yale, UCLA, the University of Illinois, Wesleyan University, the University of Rochester, NY – and has led various research projects, and lectured, in a number of foreign institutes and universities, on all continents, throughout the world.

Awards
Winner of numerous prizes and awards for research and teaching activities. He was awarded Doctor Honoris Causa by Lviv University in 2003, South West University of Finance and Economics in Chengdu, China (SWUFE) in 2004, Finance University in Moscow in 2009, University of Debrecen, Hungary, in 2009, the International Institute of Management, MIM, in Kyiv, in 2014, and Corvinus University in Budapest in 2019, and has received the honorary professorships from India Institute of Finance, New Delhi, in 2004, from Nankai University, Tianjin, China, in 2004, from Moscow Academy of Economics and Law in 2005, the Alfred Nobel University in Dnepropetrovsk, Ukraine, in 2014. In 2020 he received the Special Book Award of China. In 1996 nominated by Euromoney as the Best Minister of Finance in East Central Europe. For his achievements in managing transformation and development policy, in 1997 he was awarded the Comandoria Restituta Medal by the President of Poland.

See also
New pragmatism

References

External links 

 (Polish) Grzegorz Kołodko personal webpage
 Professor Kolodko’s blog
 Professor Kolodko’s publications in English

1949 births
Living people
People from Tczew
Deputy Prime Ministers of Poland
Finance Ministers of Poland
Polish economists
Academic staff of Kozminski University
Commanders of the Order of Polonia Restituta
Polish United Workers' Party members
Wesleyan University faculty
Foreign Members of the Russian Academy of Sciences
Fulbright alumni